Sciota hostilis is a species of snout moth in the genus Sciota. It was described by Stephens in 1834. It is found in most of Europe (except the Iberian Peninsula, Ireland and most of the Balkan Peninsula).

The wingspan is 20–24 mm. Adults are usually rather dull-coloured, dark and obscurely marked. It is a variable species however, and there are forms in which the base of the forewings is red or orange-tinted.

The larvae feed on Populus tremula from between two leaves spun together. The species overwinters in the pupal stage within a cocoon.

References

External links
lepiforum.de

Moths described in 1834
Phycitini
Moths of Europe